Branchdale is a census-designated place (CDP) in Schuylkill County, Pennsylvania, United States. The population was 436 at the 2000 census.

Geography
Branchdale is located at  (40.670453, -76.321152).

Demographics

At the 2000 census there were 436 people, 185 households, and 113 families living in the CDP. The population density was 513.7 people per square mile (198.0/km). There were 204 housing units at an average density of 240.4/sq mi (92.7/km).  The racial makeup of the CDP was 99.54% White, and 0.46% from two or more races. Hispanic or Latino of any race were 0.46%.

Of the 185 households 28.1% had children under the age of 18 living with them, 47.6% were married couples living together, 11.9% had a female householder with no husband present, and 38.9% were non-families. 34.1% of households were one person and 19.5% were one person aged 65 or older. The average household size was 2.36 and the average family size was 3.04.

The age distribution was 24.5% under the age of 18, 6.9% from 18 to 24, 28.9% from 25 to 44, 19.3% from 45 to 64, and 20.4% 65 or older. The median age was 38 years. For every 100 females, there were 89.6 males. For every 100 females age 18 and over, there were 83.8 males.

The median household income was $27,321 and the median family income  was $36,563. Males had a median income of $31,944 versus $21,563 for females. The per capita income for the CDP was $14,378. About 5.7% of families and 12.0% of the population were below the poverty line, including 14.6% of those under age 18 and 8.8% of those age 65 or over.

References

Census-designated places in Schuylkill County, Pennsylvania
Census-designated places in Pennsylvania